Mustafa Hukić "Huka"  (6 February 1951 – 7 August 1999) was a Bosnian professional football manager and former player.

Playing career

Club
Hukić came through the youth ranks of Sloboda Tuzla and amassed a total of 25 goals in 281 league games for them. He made his senior debut for Sloboda in 1969 against Budućnost Titograd and played for them during the club's golden era, alongside players like Fuad Mulahasanović, Jusuf Hatunić, Ismet Hadžić, Nedžad Verlašević, Dževad Šećerbegović and Mersed Kovačević. He also played abroad in the NASL and in Turkey.

International
He made his debut for Yugoslavia in a January 1977 friendly match away against Colombia and has earned a total of 5 caps, scoring no goals. All of his games were against Latin American opposition and his final international was a July 1977 friendly against Argentina.

Personal life

Death
He died in a car accident on the road between Gračanica and Tuzla, aged 48.

Honours

Player
Osijek
Yugoslav Second League: 1980–81 (West)

Sloboda Tuzla
UEFA Intertoto Cup: 1983 (Joint Winner)

References

External links

1951 births
1999 deaths
Sportspeople from Tuzla
Association football defenders
Bosnia and Herzegovina footballers
Yugoslav footballers
Yugoslavia international footballers
FK Sloboda Tuzla players
NK Osijek players
San Jose Earthquakes (1974–1988) players
Sakaryaspor footballers
Adana Demirspor footballers
Yugoslav First League players
Yugoslav Second League players
North American Soccer League (1968–1984) players
Süper Lig players
Yugoslav expatriate footballers
Expatriate soccer players in the United States
Yugoslav expatriate sportspeople in the United States
Expatriate footballers in Turkey
Yugoslav expatriate sportspeople in Turkey
Bosniaks of Bosnia and Herzegovina
Bosnia and Herzegovina football managers
FK Sloboda Tuzla managers
Premier League of Bosnia and Herzegovina managers
Road incident deaths in Bosnia and Herzegovina